The NWA World Welterweight Championship is an inactive professional wrestling championship governed by the National Wrestling Alliance (NWA) and most recently promoted by NWA Mexico. The championship was originally created in 1946 by the Mexican promotion Consejo Mundial de Lucha Libre (CMLL). As with all professional wrestling championships, matches for the NWA World Welterweight Championship were not won or lost competitively but by a pre-planned ending to a match, with the outcome determined by the CMLL bookers and match makers. CMLL controlled the championship from 1946 until 1996 and again from 2007 until 2010. From 1996 until 2007 the championship was promoted mainly in Japan, initially as one of eight championships that made up the New Japan Pro-Wrestling (NJPW) J-Crown Championship. After the J-Crown was discontinued the title remained in Japan promoted by the Toryumon federation until 2007 when it returned to Mexico and CMLL. CMLL was a member of the National Wrestling Alliance (NWA) until the late 1980s but chose to keep the championship and the NWA prefix after leaving the NWA. 

The championship predates the creation of the National Wrestling Alliance in 1948 and was initially called the World Welterweight Championship, promoted by Empresa Mexicana de Lucha Libre (EMLL). When EMLL joined the National Wrestling Alliance in 1952, the NWA prefix was added. In the late 1980s, EMLL withdrew from the NWA and changed its name to Consejo Mundial de Lucha Libre (CMLL). CMLL retained ownership of three NWA-branded championships which originated in the promotion, the other two being the NWA World Middleweight Championship and the NWA World Light Heavyweight Championship. All continued to be billed as "Campeonatos de NWA" (NWA Championships). On occasion, a promotion declared the championship vacant, which meant there was no champion at that point in time. This was either due to a storyline or real-life issues such as a champion suffering an injury and being unable to defend the championship, or leaving the company.

El Santo became the first NWA World Welterweight Champion by winning an eight-man tournament when he defeated Pete Pancoff in the finals. In 1992, the then-champion Misterioso left CMLL to join the newly formed Asistencia Asesoría y Administración (AAA), vacating the championship as a result. CMLL had created the CMLL World Welterweight Championship in February 1992 as their top welterweight championship, and thus did not crown a new NWA championship for three years. Negro Casas defeated El Hijo del Santo in a tournament final as CMLL brought the championship back in the winter of 1995. The following August Casas was one of eight champions to compete in an NJPW-promoted tournament to unify the championships into the J-Crown championship. Casas lost in the first round to Shinjiro Ohtani, marking the first time the championship had changed hands outside Mexico. The championship would switch hands in each round of the tournament as Último Dragón won it the next night and then Great Sasuke won it as he won the tournament. In 1996 and 1997 the championship was defended as part of the J-Crown until it was broken up into the original individual championships. After this it was once again inactive until early 1999 when Dragon Kid became the first Toryumon-promoted champion. From 1999 until 2007 the championship was promoted exclusively by Toryumon, mainly in Japan and occasionally by Torymon's Mexican branch. On November 27, 2007, CMLL wrestler La Sombra won the title from Hajime Ohara on a Toryumon Mexico show, bringing the championship back under the control of CMLL.

In March 2010, Blue Demon Jr., the president of NWA Mexico, demanded that CMLL (a non-member of the NWA) cease promoting the NWA-branded championships, declaring that all three championships had been vacated as far as the NWA was concerned. NWA Mexico had already tried to reclaim CMLL's three NWA-branded titles on a previous occasion. CMLL ignored both requests completely, with Mephisto, the NWA Welterweight Champion, responding that "the championships belong to CMLL", thus the NWA could not vacate them. On August 12, 2010, CMLL unveiled the new NWA World Historic Welterweight Championship to replace the original championship, which it conceded to NWA Mexico. The CMLL made the last CMLL-promoted NWA World Welterweight champion, Averno, the first NWA World Historic Welterweight Champion. On June 22, 2011, Cassandro became the first NWA Mexico-promoted Welterweight Champion when he defeated Dr. Cerebro on a show in London, England.

Akantus was the most recent NWA World Welterweight champion, having defeated Impostor Jr. to win the title on April 24, 2016, marking the only known championship match in his reign. Akantus was the 63rd overall champion and the 47th person to hold the Championship. Karloff Lagarde and Américo Rocca are tied for the most title reigns, a total of three, while Lagarde holds the record for the longest individual title reign, 2,742 days from 1958 until 1965. Two men have held the title for just one day: Shinjiro Otani and Último Dragón.

Title history

Reigns by combined length

See also
List of National Wrestling Alliance championships

Footnotes

References
General

Specific

Consejo Mundial de Lucha Libre championships
New Japan Pro-Wrestling championships
Welterweight wrestling championships
World professional wrestling championships
National Wrestling Alliance championships
Toryumon championships